The Basque Mountain Horse is a breed of horse from the Basque Country of Spain and France. It is listed in the Catálogo Oficial de Razas de Ganado de España, the official catalogue of livestock breeds of Spain, in the group of autochthonous breeds in danger of extinction. The original breed standard of the "Euskal Herriko Mendiko Zaldia / Caballo de Monte del País Vasco", officially approved on 21 July 1999 and published in the Boletín Oficial del País Vasco, the official bulletin of the Basque Country, was repealed in 2015 and replaced with a new one.

At the end of 2013 the total number of breeding animals recorded in the herdbook was 4556.

References 

Horse breeds
Basque domestic animal breeds